Diego Gabriel Silva Rosa (born 12 October 2002) is a Brazilian professional footballer who plays as a midfielder for Bahia.

Club career
After 18 months on loan in Belgium with City Football Group sister club Lommel, Rosa joined Primeira Liga side Vizela on loan in July 2022 from Manchester City.

Career statistics

Club

References

2002 births
Living people
Brazilian footballers
Brazilian expatriate footballers
Brazil youth international footballers
Association football midfielders
Manchester City F.C. players
Lommel S.K. players
F.C. Vizela players
Esporte Clube Bahia players
Brazilian expatriate sportspeople in England
Expatriate footballers in England
Brazilian expatriate sportspeople in Belgium
Expatriate footballers in Belgium
Sportspeople from Salvador, Bahia
Expatriate footballers in Portugal
Brazilian expatriate sportspeople in Portugal